The Books of Breathing are several late ancient Egyptian funerary texts, intended to enable deceased people to continue to exist in the afterlife. The earliest known copy dates to about 350 BC. Other copies come from the Ptolemaic and Roman periods of Egyptian history, as late as the second century AD.  It is a simplified form of the Book of the Dead.

The books were originally named The Letter for Breathing Which Isis Made for Her Brother Osiris, The First Letter for Breathing, and The Second Letter for Breathing. They appear in many varying copies, and scholars have often confused them with each other. Their titles use the word "breathing" as a metaphorical term for all the aspects of life that the deceased hoped to experience again in the afterlife. The texts exhort various Egyptian gods to accept the deceased into their company.

Some of the papyri that Joseph Smith said to use to translate the Book of Abraham are parts of the Books of Breathing.

See also
 Book of the Dead
  Hor Book of Breathing

References

 

4th-century BC books
Ancient Egyptian funerary texts